Opoki is the name of several rural localities in Russia.

Modern rural localities
Opoki, Pskov Oblast, a village in Porkhovsky District of Pskov Oblast

Abolished rural localities
Opoki, Vologda Oblast, a former village in Vologda Oblast